Ilkhchi (also Romanized as Īlkhchī; also known as Alqazī and El’khechi) is a village in Sanjabad-e Jonubi Rural District, Firuz District, Kowsar County, Ardabil Province, Iran. At the 2006 census, its population was 169, in 38 families.

References 

Towns and villages in Kowsar County